The 2018–19 Houston Baptist Huskies women's basketball team will represent Houston Baptist University in the 2018–19 college basketball season. The Huskies, led by sixth year head coach Donna Finnie, will play their home games at the Sharp Gymnasium and were members of the Southland Conference. They finished the season 8–20, 3–15 in Southland play to finish in a tie for last place. They failed to qualify for the Southland women's tournament.

Previous season
The Huskies finished the 2017–18 season with an overall record of 10–18 and 6–12 in Southland play to finish in tenth place. They failed to qualify for the Southland women's tournament.

Roster
Sources:

Schedule and results
Sources:

|-
!colspan=9 style=| Non-Conference Schedule

|-
!colspan=9 style=| Southland Conference Schedule

See also
2018–19 Houston Baptist Huskies men's basketball team

References

Houston Christian Huskies women's basketball seasons
Houston Baptist
Houston Baptist Huskies basketball
Houston Baptist Huskies basketball